Damir Nikšić (born 6 December 1970) is a Bosnian conceptual artist, standup comedian, blogger and politician. One of his best known art works is a seven-minute-long video entitled "If I wasn't muslim" (2005).

Since 2022, Nikšić has been a member of Our Party, a social-liberal party that is a member of the ALDE group of European parties. Previously, from 2018 to 2019, he was a member of the Social Democratic Party.

Biography

General
Nikšić was born 6 December 1970 in Brezovo Polje, Brčko. He was a student at fine arts academies in Sarajevo, Milan and Bologna. In 2000 he graduated at Academy of Fine Arts Sarajevo, Painting department. He has lived in the USA 2000–2004; he has studied as a postgraduate at the University of Arizona (UA) until 2004. He magistered fine arts and art history in 2004 at UA; after that, he gave lectures at Northwestern University in Evanston, Illinois. He was a member of Maxumim art group. He exhibited at Venice Film Festival in 2003 international selection. He works and lives in Sarajevo.

Education
In 2000 he acquired a BFA degree from Academy of Fine Arts Sarajevo and moved as a graduate student to Indiana, Pennsylvania, USA. In 2001 he moved to Tucson, Arizona, where he graduated at the University of Arizona in May 2004. In 2004 he moved to Chicago, Illinois.

Sing Sing
Nikšić was a co-founder and member (vocal singer) of rhythm and blues band "Sing Sing". The band played four concerts in  Mladost.

Maxumim
Damir Nikšić is also a co-founder of Maxumim art group, together with Anur Hadžiomerspahić, Anela Šabić, Ajna Zlatar, Eldina Begić, Dejan Vekić, Almir Kurt, Samir Plasto, Hamdija Pašić, Rachel Rossner, Nebojša Šerić, Suzana Cerić, Alma Fazlić, Zlatan Filipović. In 1997, the group has its first exhibition "Maxumim I," at Collegium Artisticum, Sarajevo, which would be followed up in 1998 with "Maxumim II," and in 1999/2000 with "Maxumim III," at Collegium Artisticum, Sarajevo; Pavarotti Music Center, Mostar; Bosnian Cultural Center, Tuzla; City Gallery, Zenica; City Gallery, Bihać.

Other activities
In 2011, he protested regarding the closing of the Art Gallery of Bosnia and Herzegovina, setting up daily video updates.

Work method – criticism
He mostly presents his art through YouTube and social networks, where he uploads short videos and comments of humorous character in which he seriously and symbolically refers to the reality of Bosnia and Herzegovina. He also commented on the attack on Serbian Prime Minister Aleksandar Vučić during his visit to the event marking the 20th anniversary of the Srebrenica crime, saying in his video Srebrni pir: Manipulacija razjedinjenih nacija ("Silver Feast: A Disunited Nations Manipulation") published on 13 July 2015 that "a corrida was made of Potočari"; this has received a notable media attention in his home and neighbouring countries.

Political engagement

In mid-2016, he decided to run for mayor of the Sarajevo Center Municipality, as a "libertarian, individualist and anarchist." In an interview with the BiH portal Klix.ba, he said the following:

His goal, he said, was to make a more European city of Sarajevo and prevent the feudalisation of BiH, and that his office would always be covered by a camera whose footage would be broadcast online so that citizens could watch the "one municipality mayor's reality show" live. He did not win 2016 elections, but later became a member of the Sarajevo Canton Assembly. From 23 May 2018, until his expulsion on 16 March 2019, Nikšić was a member of the Social Democratic Party. He announced his candidacy for mayor of the same municipality in the 2020 elections.

Philosophy
Nikšić's political philosophy aims for others to understand that one is living in a crisis of civil society and thus the civil state, that is—ethnocracy is present instead of democracy. Instead of the idea of people and collectivism, he advocates individualism and the notion of citizens as individuals, calling the ideology he follows "liberal progressive individualist discourse" and "stratoseparatism."

Most notable works
If I wasn't muslim (2005)
Krunisanje Kralja Tvrtka (2007)
Totalitarni fatalizam (2015)

Songs
"Ta to ti" (2012)
"Gdje si" (2012)
"Sjedio sam u kafani sam" (2013)
"Na rubu plača" (2015)
"Stranac u svome plemenu" (2016) - izvedba pjesme grupe Major (autor: Masa Mor)
"Još jedna revolucionarna" (2018)
"Hastahana" [demo] (2020)

References

External links

 

1970 births
Living people
Bosnia and Herzegovina artists
Bosnia and Herzegovina painters
Bosnia and Herzegovina musicians
Bosnia and Herzegovina politicians
Bosnia and Herzegovina comedians
Bosnia and Herzegovina stand-up comedians
Bosnia and Herzegovina bloggers
Bosnia and Herzegovina YouTubers
Bosnia and Herzegovina humorists
University of Arizona alumni
Bosniaks of Bosnia and Herzegovina